Csanád was an 11th-century Hungarian nobleman.

Csanád may also refer to:

Csanád County, a county in the Kingdom of Hungary
Cenad, a rural municipality in Timiș County, Banat, western Romania
Roman Catholic Diocese of Szeged–Csanád, a Roman Catholic bishopric in Hungary